Swift (Shen Li-Min) is a superhero in the Wildstorm universe published by DC Comics. Swift first appeared in Stormwatch #28 and was created by Jeff Mariotte and Ron Lim. She is currently a member of The Authority.

Fictional character biography
When a comet passed by Earth, it activated a genetic quirk in some people that would manifest into superpowers either naturally or through special Seedlings called Activators. Swift was one such Seedling. Swift was brought into Stormwatch as a rookie, with her powers only partially activated. Weatherman Henry Bendix later reconfigured the Stormwatch teams, assigning her to Stormwatch Black, Stormwatch's black ops team, alongside Jenny Sparks (with whom she had a brief romance) and Jack Hawksmoor. It was then that Christine Trelane offered to fully activate Swift's powers, bringing out their full potential, and she accepted.

After Stormwatch disbanded, Swift joined former teammates in The Authority. Formerly a pacifist, she has put aside those beliefs to fight for a better world regardless of the cost. She has fought all over the world, from Moscow to Mexico to Gamora Island. During the Transfer of Power storyline, Swift was replaced by Rush from Canada after being taken out of a fight by radioactive feces. Swift was brainwashed into becoming the obedient trophy wife of a television mogul who had been part of the conspiracy to replace her and her team. She was insulted at every opportunity, from having her cooking ignored to the implications she could not remember large words. Eventually she overheard the "off-button" code of the monster Three-Willied Seth and proceeded to free herself. She literally took the heads of the television mogul and his software billionaire co-conspirator. She also saved her friend Angela Spica, the Engineer, and killed the man who had been abusing Angela.

Originally drawn flat-chested, as a plot point in the series she rapidly "developed" a more pronounced, archetypal superheroine bust size. According to Li-Min herself, this was due to her paying for very expensive breast implants, in fact she was quite boastful about them. One could surmise, due to the deconstructive, vaguely satirical nature of The Authority series, this was a joke directed at the oversized breasts usually common amongst female superheroes (including fellow Wildstorm characters Caitlin Fairchild and Zealot).

World's End

The 2008 Number of the Beast Wildstorm miniseries described the devastation of Earth and set the scene for a new Authority ongoing series, World's End, by Dan Abnett and Andy Lanning. In this series, Swift acts for the devastated Authority as a messenger and transmitter, using her powers and a code of colored balloons as a communications channel while the Authority attempt to help survivors. She finds herself followed at all times by a flock of birds confused by the new, harsher, environment. Later, Swift works closely with their rivals, Stormwatch, as the pure need to help innocent civilians has made their grudges irrelevant.

As the new Doctor

She was one of the few heroes, along with the Authority, to leave Earth on the Carrier after its sudden departure for an unknown destination in the universe. Eventually, their destination was a lure for the shift-ship to have its passengers being taken as biological resources by the malevolent alien race known as the Karibna. Prior to the Carrier's capture, Swift was knocked into coma after combating a mind-controlled Aegean and was kept at the medical ward. Unlike the other human passengers who were captured by the Karibna, Swift's comatose body remained hidden due from an unknown power that is keeping her invisible. When the Authority defeated the Karibna and returned to Earth, which was at the time about to destroy itself through the insane Century Baby Gaia Rothstein, it was revealed that Swift was chosen as Earth's new Doctor as she possesses a connection to the planet's ecosystem. Her timely coming to Earth allowed her to enter Gaia's mind and tell her that she's forgiven for all that she's done and that she needs time to heal. Jeroen Thornedike then takes Gaia to the newly restored Garden of Ancestral Memory.

Possible origin
Jenny Sparks once encountered a large egg, guarded by Tibetan monks for generations, prophesied to hatch a winged woman at the end of the millennium and usher in a golden age of love and peace. The egg's incubation was not uneventful—it had to be rescued from Nazi agents by Jenny Sparks in 1943. The mini-series this was shown in was said to show Jenny Sparks' first meeting with the members of the Authority, indicating that the egg contains Swift. However the fetus is unnamed or given any real interaction with Sparks, and this origin seems to conflict with what was previously known about Swift's life and powers.

Powers And Abilities
When her powers were only partially activated, Swift had a line of feathers that ran along the underside of her arms. This allowed for only limited flight. After being fully activated by Christine Trelane, she has the ability to grow wings from her back at will as well as claws and talons on her hands and feet. Consequently, she is called the "fastest winged mammal on the planet." She has flown fast enough to catch super-speedsters. Enhanced strength and durability are shown, including an incident where Swift flew straight through a person, causing them to explode in all directions. She has some birdlike enhanced senses; apart from superior hearing and eyesight, she is able to feel or "read" the air to locate moving things. She can also retract her claws and talons and shed her wings, which eventually decompose into liquid, although she no longer does this since joining the Authority. She has also demonstrated excellent cooking and singing skills. Swift is the navigator for The Carrier, the sentient spaceship that is headquarters for the Authority.

As the new Doctor, she can alter reality as she imagines it.

References

External links
International Hero profile

Characters created by Ron Lim
Comics characters introduced in 1995
DC Comics characters who can move at superhuman speeds
DC Comics characters with superhuman strength
DC Comics female superheroes
DC Comics LGBT superheroes
Fictional bisexual females
Stormwatch and the Authority characters
Fictional Tibetan people
Swift